Khoren Gevor (born Khoren Gevorgyan on 16 March 1980) is an Armenian-German professional boxer. He is a former European middleweight champion and multiple time world title challenger.

Biography
Gevor was born on March 16, 1980, in Etchmiadzin, Armenia. He moved to Hamburg, Germany when he was 16 and currently fights out of there. He is known for his good technique and speed.

Amateur career
Gevor started boxing at the age of 12. He had a very successful amateur career with 72 wins in 75 fights and won six national Armenian titles. He turned pro in 2000 and signed a contract with Universum Box Promotion. He is currently managed by Klaus-Peter Kohl.

Professional career
Gevor won his first professional titles when, on December 3, 2005, he stopped Mexican Gustavo Magallanes in the eighth round and won the vacant IBF and WBO Inter-Continental middleweight titles. He defended both titles against Sergey Khomitsky before vacating them soon after.

Gevor fought against compatriot Arthur Abraham for the IBF Middleweight title on August 18, 2007. Gevor was defeated by an 11th-round knockout from a powerful left hook.

On November 28, 2008, Gevor beat Finn Amin Asikainen in his hometown of Helsinki by 7th-round knockout and won the European championship belt.

Gevor lost a controversial bout to WBA Middleweight Champion Felix Sturm by unanimous decision on July 11, 2009.

On April 9, 2011, Gevor fought WBO Super Middleweight Champion Robert Stieglitz in a very competitive brawl. Gevor received a cut over his left eye in round three. The fight got more dirty in round ten when, after referee Manfred Küchler deducted a point from Gevor, both fighters wrestled each other onto the canvas. Stieglitz emerged with a cut over his right eye and Gevor was disqualified by the referee. Angry, Gevor attacked Küchler and was removed by security.

Gevor fought Baker Barakat in a six-round bout on December 10, 2011. The whole fight was fairly even. As soon as Barakat was announced the winner by decision, Gevor turned to the referee and punched him in the face. Barakat and people from both corners tried to hold Gevor back. Later in the dressing rooms, the fighting continued and police had to be called in to break it up.

Personal life
Gevor has with Nenel Gevorgyan two sons and a daughter. Both his sons are also boxers, fighting for a club in Hamburg, and have become Northern Germany champions. In his free time, Khoren enjoys radio-controlled cars and motor racing.

Professional boxing record

|-
| style="text-align:center;" colspan="8"|35 wins (17 knockouts), 11 losses (2 knockouts, 9 decisions), 0 draws 
|-  style="text-align:center; background:#e3e3e3;"
|  style="border-style:none none solid solid; "|Result
|  style="border-style:none none solid solid; "|Record
|  style="border-style:none none solid solid; "|Opponent
|  style="border-style:none none solid solid; "|Type
|  style="border-style:none none solid solid; "|Rounds
|  style="border-style:none none solid solid; "|Date
|  style="border-style:none none solid solid; "|Location
|  style="border-style:none none solid solid; "|Notes
|- align=center
|Loss
|35–11
|align=left| Luka Plantić
|UD
|10
|2022-12-17
|align=left| Sportska Dvorana Bilankusa, Solin, Croatia
|align=left|
|- align=center
|Win
|35–10
|align=left| Lukasz Stanioch
|TD
|5 (10)
|2022-09-30
|align=left| Hala Sportowa BKS Stal, Tadeusza Rychlinskiego 19, Bielsko-Biala, Poland
|
|- align=center
|Loss
|34–10
|align=left| Giovanni De Carolis
|UD
|12
|21/06/2019
|align=left| Parco della Pace, Rome, Italy
|align=left|
|- align=center
|Win
|34–9
|align=left| Dayron Lester
|SD
|8
|17/02/2019
|align=left| Große Freiheit 36, St. Pauli, Hamburg, Germany
|
|- align=center
|Win
|33–9
|align=left| Viktor Polyakov
|UD
|8
|08/04/2018
|align=left| Große Freiheit 36, St. Pauli, Hamburg, Germany
|
|- align=center
|Loss
|32–9
|align=left| Maxim Vlasov
|UD
|10
|05/11/2012
|align=left| Sports Palace Quant, Troitsk, Moscow, Russia
|align=left|
|- align=center
|Loss
|32–8
|align=left| Baker Barakat
|PTS
|6
|10/12/2011
|align=left| Sommer-Rodelbahn, Mechernich, Nordrhein-Westfalen, Germany
|align=left|
|- align=center
|Win
|32–7
|align=left| Olegs Fedotovs
|TKO
|6 
|03/10/2011
|align=left| Theater Carré, Amsterdam, Netherlands
|align=left|
|- align=center
|Loss
|31–7
|align=left| Nikola Sjekloca
|UD
|12
|15/07/2011
|align=left| EWS Arena, Goeppingen, Baden-Württemberg, Germany
|align=left|
|- align=center
|Loss
|31–6
|align=left| Robert Stieglitz
|DQ
|10 
|09/04/2011
|align=left| Bordelandhalle, Magdeburg, Sachsen-Anhalt, Germany
|align=left|
|- align=center
|Loss
|31–5
|align=left| Dimitri Sartison
|UD
|12
|31/07/2010
|align=left| O2 World, Altona, Hamburg, Germany
|align=left|
|- align=center
|Win
|31–4
|align=left| Jeferson Luis Goncalo
|UD
|10
|09/01/2010
|align=left| Bordelandhalle, Magdeburg, Sachsen-Anhalt, Germany
|align=left|
|- align=center
|Loss
|30–4
|align=left| Felix Sturm
|UD
|12
|11/07/2009
|align=left| Nuerburgring race track, Nuerburg, Rheinland-Pfalz, Germany
|align=left|
|- align=center
|Win
|30–3
|align=left| Amin Asikainen
|TKO
|7 
|28/11/2008
|align=left| Hartwall Arena, Nuerburg, Helsinki, Finland
|align=left|
|- align=center
|Win
|29–3
|align=left| Samir Dos Santos Barbosa
|UD
|10
|19/04/2008
|align=left| Bordelandhalle, Magdeburg, Sachsen-Anhalt, Germany
|align=left|
|- align=center
|Win
|28–3
|align=left| Nicolas Perillo
|DQ
|7 
|30/11/2007
|align=left| Dm-Arena, Karlsruhe, Baden-Württemberg, Germany
|align=left|
|- align=center
|Loss
|27–3
|align=left| Arthur Abraham
|KO
|11 
|18/08/2007
|align=left| Max Schmeling Halle, Prenzlauer Berg, Berlin, Germany
|align=left|
|- align=center
|Win
|27–2
|align=left| Rafael Sosa Pintos
|UD
|8
|28/04/2007
|align=left| Koenig Pilsener Arena, Oberhausen, Nordrhein-Westfalen, Germany
|align=left|
|- align=center
|Win
|26–2
|align=left| Edison Francisco Guedes
|TKO
|6 
|27/02/2007
|align=left| Kugelbake-Halle, Cuxhaven, Niedersachsen, Germany
|align=left|
|- align=center
|Win
|25–2
|align=left| Andile Tshongolo
|TKO
|3 
|19/09/2006
|align=left| Kugelbake-Halle, Cuxhaven, Niedersachsen, Germany
|align=left|
|- align=center
|Win
|24–2
|align=left| Sergey Khomitsky
|UD
|12
|07/03/2006
|align=left| Kugelbake-Halle, Cuxhaven, Niedersachsen, Germany
|align=left|
|- align=center
|Win
|23–2
|align=left| Gustavo Magallanes
|TKO
|8 
|03/12/2005
|align=left| Bordelandhalle, Magdeburg, Sachsen-Anhalt, Germany
|align=left|
|- align=center
|Win
|22–2
|align=left| Franck Mezaache
|TD
|8 
|28/06/2005
|align=left| Kugelbake-Halle, Cuxhaven, Niedersachsen, Germany
|align=left|
|- align=center
|Win
|21–2
|align=left| Francesco Pernice
|TKO
|4 
|26/03/2005
|align=left| Erdgas Arena, Riesa, Sachsen, Germany
|align=left|
|- align=center
|Win
|20–2
|align=left| Alexey Chirkov
|UD
|8
|18/01/2005
|align=left| Kugelbake-Halle, Cuxhaven, Niedersachsen, Germany
|align=left|
|- align=center
|Win
|19–2
|align=left| Ian McLeod
|RTD
|5 
|15/08/2004
|align=left| State Sports Centre, Homebush Bay, Sydney, Australia
|align=left|
|- align=center
|Win
|18–2
|align=left| Sergey Tatevosyan
|UD
|8
|18/05/2004
|align=left| Hansehalle, Lübeck, Schleswig-Holstein, Germany
|align=left|
|- align=center
|Win
|17–2
|align=left| Dmytro Hotovskyy
|DQ
|6 
|30/03/2004
|align=left| Saaltheater Geulen, Aachen, Nordrhein-Westfalen, Germany
|align=left|
|- align=center
|Win
|16–2
|align=left| Kai Kauramaki
|KO
|4 
|02/03/2004
|align=left| Universum Gym, Wandsbek, Hamburg, Germany
|align=left|
|- align=center
|Win
|15–2
|align=left| Ryszard Kraz
|TKO
|2 
|10/01/2004
|align=left| Wismar, Mecklenburg-Vorpommern, Germany
|align=left|
|- align=center
|Win
|14–2
|align=left| Adrian Sauca
|UD
|6
|06/09/2003
|align=left| Uj-Szeged Sporthall, Szeged, Hungary
|align=left|
|- align=center
|Win
|13–2
|align=left| Gyorgy Bugyik
|PTS
|6
|06/07/2003
|align=left| Avendi Hotel, Bad Honnef, Nordrhein-Westfalen, Germany
|align=left|
|- align=center
|Win
|12–2
|align=left| Murad Makhmudov
|SD
|8
|25/04/2003
|align=left| Maritim Hotel, Magdeburg, Sachsen-Anhalt, Germany
|align=left|
|- align=center
|Loss
|11–2
|align=left| Lukas Konecny
|TKO
|8 
|21/12/2002
|align=left| Lausitz Arena, Cottbus, Brandenburg, Germany
|align=left|
|- align=center
|Loss
|11–1
|align=left| Lukas Konecny
|TD
|7 
|21/09/2002
|align=left| Bordelandhalle, Magdeburg, Sachsen-Anhalt, Germany
|align=left|
|- align=center
|Win
|11–0
|align=left| Ivan Vavrecan
|TKO
|3 
|29/06/2002
|align=left| Marriott Hotel, Mitte, Berlin, Germany
|align=left|
|- align=center
|Win
|10–0
|align=left| Eugenio Monteiro
|PTS
|6
|06/04/2002
|align=left| Universum Gym, Wandsbek, Hamburg, Germany
|align=left|
|- align=center
|Win
|9–0
|align=left| Marek Marusak
|KO
|2 
|26/01/2002
|align=left| Berlin, Germany
|align=left|
|- align=center
|Win
|8–0
|align=left| Marek Jesenic
|KO
|2 
|24/11/2001
|align=left| Universum Gym, Wandsbek, Hamburg, Germany
|align=left|
|- align=center
|Win
|7–0
|align=left| Tibor Horvath
|KO
|1 
|20/10/2001
|align=left| Rathenauhalle, Treptow-Köpenick, Berlin, Germany
|align=left|
|- align=center
|Win
|6–0
|align=left| Ivan Vavrecan
|TKO
|1 
|29/09/2001
|align=left| Universum Gym, Wandsbek, Hamburg, Germany
|align=left|
|- align=center
|Win
|5–0
|align=left| Peter Resour
|PTS
|6
|28/07/2001
|align=left| Estrel Convention Center, Neukölln, Berlin, Germany
|align=left|
|- align=center
|Win
|4–0
|align=left| Zsolt Gyalog
|KO
|1 
|07/04/2001
|align=left| Universum Gym, Wandsbek, Hamburg, Germany
|align=left|
|- align=center
|Win
|3–0
|align=left| Patrik Hruska
|PTS
|4
|10/02/2001
|align=left| Estrel Convention Center, Neukölln, Berlin, Germany
|align=left|
|- align=center
|Win
|2–0
|align=left| Milan Smetana
|TKO
|1 
|05/12/2000
|align=left| Universum Gym, Wandsbek, Hamburg, Germany
|align=left|
|- align=center
|Win
|1–0
|align=left| Zdenek Zubko
|TKO
|1 
|01/10/2000
|align=left| Universum Gym, Wandsbek, Hamburg, Germany
|align=left|
|- align=center

Boxing titles
IBF Inter-Continental Middleweight Champion (2006)
WBO Inter-Continental Middleweight Champion (2006)
EBU European Middleweight Champion (2008)

References

External links
 
Official homepage of Khoren Gevor

Armenian male boxers
1979 births
People from Vagharshapat
Living people
German people of Armenian descent
Armenian emigrants to Germany
German male boxers
Middleweight boxers